Jorge del Moral Ugarte (23 December 1900 in Mexico City – 1941) was a Mexican concert pianist and songwriter.

Songs
 Besos robados
 Tu imposible amor
 Nunca Digas

References

1900 births
1941 deaths
Musicians from Mexico City
Mexican songwriters
Male songwriters
Mexican pianists
20th-century pianists
Male pianists
20th-century male musicians
1940s deaths